Sanhueza is a surname and it may refer to:

Arturo Sanhueza (born 1979), Chilean footballer
Henry Sanhueza (born 1996), Chilean footballer
Juan Carlos Sanhueza (born 1989), Chilean footballer
Miguel Sanhueza (born 1991), Chilean footballer
Nicol Sanhueza (born 1992), Chilean footballer
Waldo Sanhueza (1900-1966), Chilean footballer and manager